Alejandro Leonel Williams Cordero (born 28 October 1969) is a dentist and politician from the Dominican Republic. He was Senator for the province of San Pedro de Macorís.

Williams has a doctorate in medicine from the Universidad Central del Este; thereafter
he migrated to the United States and opened a dental clinic in The Bronx. The expansion on his business caused him to have eight clinics throughout NYC.

In May 2006, Williams was elected as Senator of San Pedro de Macorís with 50.46% of the votes, winning over Social Christian Reformist Party's José Hazim Frappier, heir of an economic empire that includes Williams's alma mater.

Williams's tenure was marked by a low participation in meetings and committees, which by 2008 would be virtually nil. In 2009, close to the end of his tenure, Williams found himself in a controversy over his poor attendance to the Senate's sessions. Also, Williams was being subject to investigations in the United States due to an alleged Medicare fraud; the opposition called for an impeachment to remove him from office. His party rejected his candidacy for the 2010 parliamentary election, and expelled him.

Williams was the candidate for senator of San Pedro de Macorís for the Independent Revolutionary Party (PRI) in 2010. He obtained 2.26% of the votes.

References 

Living people
1969 births
People from San Pedro de Macorís Province
Dominican Republic dentists
Dominican Liberation Party politicians
Independent Revolutionary Party politicians
Dominican Republic expatriates in the United States
Dominican Republic people of Cocolo descent
Members of the Senate of the Dominican Republic